Boce may refer to:

Geography
Boće, Bosnia and Herzegovina
Boće (Raška) Serbia
Bocé, former commune in the Maine-et-Loire department in western France

People
Elmaz Boçe (1852–1925) Albanian educator

Other
Boces (disambiguation)